Raj Bhavan, Dehradun or Governor's House, Dehradun is the official residence of the governor of Uttarakhand. Uttarakhand is one of the few Indian states which have two official buildings of Raj Bhavans. The first one is located in the capital city of Dehradun. The second Raj Bhavan of Uttarakhand is located in Nainital. The current governor of Uttarakhand is Gurmit Singh.

Raj Bhavan at Dehradun
The present Raj Bhavan of Dehradun was built in 1902. Earlier it was known as "Court House", where the then Governor of United Provinces often used to reside.
With the creation of the State of Uttarakhand, the Raj Bhavan was temporarily established at Bijapur House located on New Cantt Road in Dehradun. Subsequently, the Circuit House of Dehradun was re-designated as Raj Bhavan and the first Governor of Uttarakhand, Surjit Singh Barnala, shifted there on 25 December 2000.In the post-Independence period, India's first Prime Minister, Jawaharlal Nehru used to stay in this building whenever he visited Dehradun. From time to time, various Presidents of India and almost all Indian Prime Ministers, so far, have stayed in this historic building. 
The sprawling lawns, Bonsai Garden and rich floral species add to the areal beauty of the Raj Bhavan.The Auditorium of Raj Bhavan is a special venue where various important events e.g. oath-taking ceremonies, seminars, book-release functions and cultural programmes etc. are organised.

See also
 Raj Bhavan, Nainital
 Government Houses of the British Indian Empire

References

External links
 Official website of Raj Bhavan, Uttarakhand
 Rajbhavan Nainital
 Government of Uttarakhand, Official website
 https://web.archive.org/web/20061027143752/http://www.sarkaritel.com/states/governors_state.htm

Governors' houses in India
Government of Uttarakhand
Buildings and structures in Dehradun
Houses completed in 1902
1902 establishments in India
Government buildings completed in 1902
20th-century architecture in India